Aurai is a town and a nagar panchayat in Sant Ravidas Nagar district, Uttar Pradesh state, India. It is 33 km from its District Main City of Gyanpur and 235 km from the state capital of Lucknow.

References 

http://myneta.info/up2012/index.php?action=show_candidates&constituency_id=394

Bhadohi district
Tehsils of Uttar Pradesh